Christopher Denise is an American artist of two of Brian Jacques' Redwall picture books. He illustrated the picture books The Great Redwall Feast and A Redwall Winter's Tale. He also illustrated The Redwall Cookbook. Knight Owl which he wrote and illustrated was a 2023 Caldecott Honor book.   

Denise was born in Ashland, Massachusetts, and raised in Ireland. After returning to the United States he attended St. Lawrence University before leaving to attend the Rhode Island School of Design. He began his artistic career illustrating textbooks and newspapers while a student at RISD. Denise's first book, The Fool of the World and the Flying Ship, is a retelling of a Russian fairytale and was said by Publishers Weekly to be "a stunning debut". In addition to illustrating books, he also does visual development work for animated feature films. He and his wife, children's author Anika Denise, lived in Providence, Rhode Island, prior to moving to Barrington, Rhode Island.

Illustrated Works 

 The Fool of the World and the Flying Ship (author and illustrator), 1994
 The Great Redwall Feast (by Brian Jacques), 1996
 Little Raccoon Catches a Cold (by Susan Cañizares), 1997
 Digger Pig and the Turnip (by Caron Lee Cohen), 2000
 A Redwall Winter's Tale (by Brian Jacques), 2001
 Oliver Finds His Way (by Phyllis Root), 2002
 Rabbit and Turtle Go to School (by Lucy Floyd), 2003
 The Wishing of Biddy Malone (by Joy Cowley), 2004
 The Redwall Cookbook (by Brian Jacques), 2005
 Pigs Love Potatoes (by Anika Aldamuy Denise), 2008
 If I Could: A Mother's Promise (by Susan Milord), 2008
 Knitty Kitty (by David Elliott), 2008
 The Fox and the Gulls (by Katacha Diaz), 2009
 Me With You (by Kristy Dempsey), 2009
 Bella and Stella Come Home (by Anika Aldamuy Denise), 2010
 Tugg and Teeny (by J. Patrick Lewis) 2011
 Tugg and Teeny: That's What Friends Are For (by J. Patrick Lewis) 2011
 Tugg and Teeny: Jungle Surprises (by J. Patrick Lewis) 2011
 Following Grandfather (by Rosemary Wells), 2012
 Baking Day at Grandma's (by Anika Aldamuy Denise), 2014
 Sleepytime Me (by Edith Hope Fine), 2014
 Firefly Hollow (by Alison McGhee), 2015
 Lucy's Lovey (by Betsy Devany), 2016
 Groundhug Day (by Anne Marie Pace), 2017
 Bunny in the Middle (by Anika A. Denise), 2019
 Knight Owl (by Christopher Denise), 2022

References

External links
 ChristopherDenise.com
 2007 interview

Living people
American children's book illustrators
St. Lawrence University alumni
Rhode Island School of Design alumni
Artists from Providence, Rhode Island
People from Barrington, Rhode Island
Redwall
Year of birth missing (living people)